Mount Saint Joseph College (commonly MSJ or Mount Saint Joe) is a Catholic college preparatory school and secondary school / high school for young men from ninth to twelfth grade sponsored by the Xaverian Brothers and founded in 1876. It is located within the Archdiocese of Baltimore, Maryland.

Extracurricular activities

School colors and mascot
The school colors are purple and cream. The mascot of the Mount is the Gael.

Sports
Mount Saint Joseph plays most of its sports including wrestling, football, rugby, soccer, volleyball, basketball, baseball, lacrosse, mountain biking, water polo and tennis in the Maryland Interscholastic Athletic Association (MIAA) “A” Conference against other Catholic and private schools. The basketball team competes in both the MIAA and the Baltimore Catholic League. The most success has come from the wrestling program, whose varsity team has over 30 state championships and 9 national championships. The basketball team won the Baltimore Catholic League in 2012/13.

Clubs and activities
Mount Saint Joseph sponsors many student-inspired clubs such as chain-mail club, the Beatles club, Think Tank, the anime club, the video game club, and an It's Academic team, which won the Baltimore Catholic League in 2001 2007, 2008 and 2013. There is also a chapter of the National Honor Society, as well as an ACE Mentoring program for aspiring engineers. In recent years, the school has begun a Model United Nations team, and has participated in the National History Bee and Bowl since its inauguration in 2010, with at least one of its teams advancing to the national tournament every year.  The Drama Club partners up with the local Catholic all-girls school, Mount de Sales Academy to perform two shows each year: a play in the fall and a musical in the spring.

Notable alumni

George E. Heffner, member of the Maryland House of Delegates
Gordon England (1955) - United States Deputy Secretary of Defense and two-time Secretary of the Navy
Tom Phoebus (1960) - professional baseball player during the 1960s and 1970s
Emory Elliott (1960) - Professor of American literature and advocate for expanding the literary canon to include a more diverse range of voices.
Kurt Seibert (1974) - professional baseball player, second baseman for the Chicago Cubs
James A. Watson (1974) - Rear Admiral James Watson, United States Coast Guard, Atlantic Area Command
Larry Collmus (1984) - Triple Crown races caller for NBC Sports
Jim Schwartz (1984) -  Senior Defensive Assistant for the Tennessee Titans. Former Head Coach of the Detroit Lions (2009-2013). Won the 2018 Super Bowl as the Defensive Coordinator of the Philadelphia Eagles
Mark Teixeira (1998) - Major League 1B, 2003-2016 for Texas Rangers and New York Yankees
Tommy Hannan (1998) - Olympic Gold Medalist (2000 Summer Olympics)
Torrey Butler (1998) - professional basketball player
Michael O'Connor (1998) - Professional Athlete, former Pitcher for the Washington Nationals
Stephen Berger (2000) - Professional Athlete, Lacrosse
Rob Abiamiri (2000) - Professional Athlete, Tight End
Gavin Floyd (2001) - Professional Athlete, former Pitcher for several MLB teams, including the Chicago White Sox
Will Thomas (2004) - Helped lead George Mason Patriots basketball team to the Final Four
Brendan Mundorf (2002) - Professional Lacrosse player and 2012 Major League Lacrosse MVP
Steve Clevenger (2004) - Professional Athlete, former catcher for the Chicago Cubs, Baltimore Orioles, and Seattle Mariners
Henry Sims (2008) – Professional Athlete, former basketball center who played for Georgetown University before playing for several NBA teams, including the Philadelphia 76ers.
Kyle Fuller (2010) - Professional football player, Cornerback for the Baltimore Ravens
 Jalen Robinson (2012) - Professional Soccer Player for Loudoun United
 Phil Booth (2014)- Professional Basketball Guard. Won 2 NCAA championships for the Villanova Wildcats. Currently plays for KK Budućnost
 Jaylen Adams (2014) - Professional Basketball Guard for Crvena zvezda. Won 2022 MVP of the National Basketball League (Australia) as a member of the Sydney Kings
 Peter Solomon (baseball) (2014) - Major League Baseball pitcher for the Pittsburgh Pirates.
Jalen Smith (2018) - Professional Basketball Center for the Indiana Pacers

See also 

National Catholic Educational Association

References

External links
Roman Catholic Archdiocese of Baltimore

Irvington, Baltimore
Schools sponsored by the Xaverian Brothers
Catholic secondary schools in Maryland
Educational institutions established in 1876
Private schools in Baltimore
Middle States Commission on Secondary Schools
Boys' schools in Maryland
1876 establishments in Maryland
Catholic schools in Maryland